"Daughters" is the 24th episode of the sixteenth season of the American police procedural drama NCIS, and the 378th episode overall. It originally aired on CBS in the United States on May 21, 2019. The episode is written by Steven D. Binder and directed by Tony Wharmby, and was seen by 12.10 million viewers.

Plot
Former FBI agent Tobias Fornell (Joe Spano) pleads with Gibbs to do whatever is necessary to take down drug dealers after his daughter Emily is hospitalized from an opiate overdose; Gibbs is haunted by the personal aspects of the case and his history with vigilante justice, and, much like he has had with Mike Franks in the past, he struggles with visions of Diane Sterling, the dead ex-wife of both Gibbs and Fornell. After catching those responsible and coming to a resolution with Diane's ghost, Gibbs sees Ziva David appearing at his house to warn him he is in danger.

Production
"Daughters" was written by Steven D. Binder and directed by Tony Wharmby. This episode marked the return of a former series regular Cote de Pablo (Ziva David).

References

2019 American television episodes
NCIS (season 16) episodes